is a former Japanese volleyball player.

Career
Yuki became a volleyball player when in a Primary school. At the time when she was in the 3rd grade of Higashikyushu Ryokoku High School she served as a captain of the team. The team won the top of Japanese high school with Kyoko Katashita.

She retired from JT Marvelous in June of 2011. She signed with Victorina Himeji on July 1, 2018. She retired from volleyball in June of 2019 after captaining Victorina Himeji to a season championship.

Clubs
  Higashi Kyushu Ryukoku High School
  JT Marvelous (2008-2011)
  Victorina Himeji (2018-2019)

Awards

Individual 
 2007: Champion in the 6th Asian Youth Volleyball Championship
 2008: 5th place in the Olympic Games of Beijing
 2008: Champion in the 14th Asian Junior Volleyball Championship - MVP, Best Setter award
 2010 Asian Club Championship "Best Setter"

Team 
2009-2010 V.Premier League -  Runner-Up, with JT Marvelous
2010 59th Kurowashiki All Japan Volleyball Tournament -  Runner-Up, with JT Marvelous
2010-11 V.Premier League -  Champion, with JT Marvelous
2011 60th Kurowashiki All Japan Volleyball Tournament -  Champion, with JT Marvelous
2019 V.League Division 2 (V2) Women's Tournament -  Champion, with Victorina Himeji

National team
 Youth National Team (2007)
 National Team (2007-)
 Junior National Team (2008)

References

External links
FIVB Profile

Volleyball players at the 2008 Summer Olympics
1990 births
Japanese women's volleyball players
Olympic volleyball players of Japan
JT Marvelous players
Living people
Sportspeople from Ōita Prefecture